Willesden West was a constituency in Middlesex adjoining the County of London and forming part of the London conurbation, in London itself from 1965. It returned one member to the House of Commons of the UK Parliament 1918–1974.

The outcome of the seat switched permanently to electing the Labour candidate, in 1923 — save for the four-year term when the party's number of MPs fell from 327 to 52 seats (1931-1935) and when the seat elected notable women's right advocate Mrs Mavis Tate.

History

Until 1918, Willesden formed part of the Harrow Division of Middlesex. The constituency was created by the Representation of the People Act 1918, and was first contested in the general election of that year. The boundaries were altered by further legislation in 1948 and the constituency was abolished when new seats based on the London Boroughs created by the London Government Act 1963 came into use for the February 1974 general election. The area of the constituency was divided between the two new seats of Brent East and Brent North.

Boundaries
The 1918 legislation created a new parliamentary borough of Willesden, identical in area with the urban district of Willesden, and divided it into two single-member divisions. Willesden West comprised five of the eleven wards of the urban district: Church End, Harlesden, Roundwood, Stonebridge and Willesden Green. The remaining six wards formed the Willseden East division. In 1933 Willesden was incorporated as a municipal borough, although this made no change to the parliamentary divisions.

When constituencies were redrawn prior to the 1950 general election, Willesden West was redefined in terms of seven wards of the borough as they then existed: Church End, Harlesden, Kensal Rise, Manor, Roundwood, Stonebridge and Willesden Green. Kensal Rise had previously formed part of Willesden East.

Members of Parliament

Elections

Elections in the 1910s

Elections in the 1920s

Elections in the 1930s 

General Election 1939–40

Another General Election was required to take place before the end of 1940. The political parties had been making preparations for an election to take place and by the Autumn of 1939, the following candidates had been selected; 
Labour: Samuel Viant
Conservative:

Elections in the 1940s

Elections in the 1950s

Elections in the 1960s

Elections in the 1970s

References

Parliamentary constituencies in London (historic)
Constituencies of the Parliament of the United Kingdom established in 1918
Constituencies of the Parliament of the United Kingdom disestablished in 1974
Politics of the London Borough of Brent
Willesden